Personalised television (TV) is service for interactive television technology. It involves serving curated TV content to a user that suits their own personal tastes. Personalised TV can be created by using recommendation algorithms, personal taste profiles, and content filtering.

Personalised TV also can help target advertisements more accurately. In April 2011, the Wall Street Journal that television companies are using personal data — even data on what drugs viewers had been prescribed – to compete with Google and other online services that target users for ads based on their past surfing habits.

Barriers to Adoption 
Despite huge gains in technology, there are still many barriers to adoption:

 Attitudes: Viewers are less willing to ‘personalise’ their TV service than web or mobile device users.
 Technology: The technology to easily type and enter information on a TV is limited. Most remote controls can only interact with the TV on a basic level. This makes filling out any kind of personal profile difficult.
 Passivity: Many viewers don't want to take action when they turn on the TV- they just want to  passively watch.
 Groups: Watching TV is often a social experience. This means that one viewer's personalised selection of content may not suit the group of people who are watching that day. Additionally, some viewers may wish to keep their viewing habits private from group use.
 Privacy: Many European countries have a strong culture of data privacy and attempts to introduce any level of user profiling can result in a negative customer response. This may not be a barrier in other countries where privacy restrictions are more open.

References

Interactive television